Waldo Samuel Flint (February 23, 1820October 1, 1900) was an American farmer, nurseryman, and Republican politician.  He served two years in the Wisconsin State Senate, representing Green Lake County and central Wisconsin.

Biography
Flint was born on February 23, 1820, in Braintree, Vermont. He moved to Rochester, Wisconsin Territory, in 1842 and then to Princeton, Wisconsin, in 1850. He moved to a farm near Nashua, Iowa, in 1876, and then to Nashua in 1893. Flint died in Nashua on October 1, 1900.

Career
Flint was a member of the Senate from 1871 until 1873.  He ran as an Independent Republican, defeating Republican candidate James A. Briggs.  He was initially elected in the 29th Senate district, but by the enaction of the 1871 redistricting act, he became the representative of the 25th Senate district.  Additionally, he was President of Princeton and Chairman of the Green Lake County, Wisconsin, Board of Supervisors. He was a Republican.

Personal life and family
Flint's older brother Edwin Flint also served in the Wisconsin Senate and was a Wisconsin circuit court judge.

References

External links

People from Braintree, Vermont
People from Rochester, Wisconsin
People from Princeton, Wisconsin
County supervisors in Wisconsin
Republican Party Wisconsin state senators
1820 births
1900 deaths
19th-century American politicians